Battle for the Castle: The Myth of Czechoslovakia in Europe, 1914–1948 is a 2009 book written by Andrea Orzoff and published by Oxford University Press. It argues that Czechoslovakia promoted an overly favorable view of itself, termed the Czechoslovak myth. Reviews were generally favorable.

References

2009 non-fiction books
Oxford University Press books
Books about Czechoslovakia